Claremore High School is a public high school located in Claremore, Oklahoma.

Administration
As of 11 February 2023, Kenneth Hindenburg is the principal. Other faculty include:
Darren Grisham, assistant principal - JR./SR.
Brook Lee, assistant principal- SO
Brian Key, assistant principal- FR

Academics
Claremore High School uses the block scheduling method of class organization. Each student is enrolled in four classes per semester (two blocks per semester, two semesters per year), rather than six or seven. One block equals one half credit and 2 blocks equal one whole credit.

The high school also offers numerous Advanced Placement courses, including biology, calculus AB/BC, chemistry, English language and composition, English literature and composition, European history, French language, German language, Music theory, psychology, Spanish language, Spanish literature, statistics, studio art, and US history.

Junior and senior students may also be enrolled in a morning or afternoon session at one of the NorthEast Tech Centers

Alumni
Stuart A. Roosa, astronaut
Helen Walton, wife of walmart founder

Matt Whatley (baseball), Professional Baseball Player

References

External links
Claremore High School web site

Public high schools in Oklahoma
Schools in Rogers County, Oklahoma